Wild Cards is a series of science fiction superhero shared universe anthologies, mosaic novels, and solo novels written by a collection of authors known as the Wild Cards Trust and edited by George R. R. Martin and Melinda M. Snodgrass. Set largely during an alternate history of post-World War II United States, the series follows humans who contracted the Wild Card virus, an alien virus that rewrites DNA and mutates survivors; those who acquire minor or crippling physical conditions are known as Jokers, and those who acquire superhuman abilities are known as Aces.

As of the publication of Texas Hold'Em in October 2018, the series consists of twenty-six books. Wild Cards began publication through Bantam Books, under its Spectra imprint, in January 1987. Bantam published the series until 1993 and released twelve installments. Baen Books published three books from 1993 to 1995. From 2002 to 2005, ibooks Inc. published two more installments, including one solo novel. Wild Cards is currently published by Tor Books, an imprint under Macmillan Publishers. As of October 2018, Tor Books had released nine novels.

Several novels were also reprinted. Reprinting rights to the first eight novels were acquired by ibooks Inc. in 2000. The company reissued the first six novels before declaring Chapter 7 bankruptcy shortly after the death of founder Byron Preiss; ibooks' assets were acquired by Brick Tower Press. As of November 2021, Tor Books reprinted the first twelve, sixteenth & seventeenth novel.

Marvel Entertainment has published two Wild Cards mini-series, thirty-two years apart. The first, released via their Epic Comics imprint, was published from September to December 1990 and featured an original storyline based on events that occurred in the early novels. A second limited series, this time adapting stories from the first novel, ran from June through October, 2022.

Books

Bantam Books (1987–1993) 
Bantam Books, under its Spectra imprint, published twelve books between 1987 and 1993, including two solo novels written by Melinda M. Snodgrass and Victor Milán.

Baen Books (1993–1995) 
Baen Books published a new triad between 1993 and 1995 subtitled of a New Cycle. In 2002, Martin commented that he felt the triad was creatively "three of the strongest volumes Wild Cards ever had" and that the series "came back strong" after stumbling with a previous storyline; however, he conceded that the triad was "very dark", acknowledging it was a commonly voiced complaint, and that he felt switching publishers was a mistake.

ibooks Inc. (2002–2006) 
In 2000, ibooks Inc. purchased two new installments and the rights to reprint the first eight books of the series; the two new books were published between 2002 and 2006, including a solo novel by John J. Miller. The company filed for Chapter 7 bankruptcy in July 2005, shortly after the death of founder Byron Preiss. In December 2006, J. Bolyston & Co. Publishers, parent company of the Brick Tower Press imprint, acquired all of Preiss' assets, including those of ibooks, for $125,000. Brick Tower Press offered e-book versions of its titles, including Deuces Down and Death Draws Five, via Humble Bundle in February 2016.

Tor Books (2008–present) 
Tor Books, an imprint under Macmillan Publishers, currently publishes the series in both print and e-book format. It released six new installments from November 2008 to August 2016.

On his blog in March 2016, Martin stated that Tor Books acquired three installments after High Stakes. Working titles for the books are Texas Hold 'Em, Mississippi Roll, and Low Chicago. He also announced that Saladin Ahmed, Max Gladstone, Marko Kloos, and Diana Rowland will contribute to the triad.

Short stories 
Tor Books publishes short stories through its website beginning January 2013:
 "When We Were Heroes" by Daniel Abraham (January 16, 2013), edited by Martin
 "The Button Man and the Murder Tree" by Cherie Priest (May 15, 2013), edited by Martin
 "The Elephant in the Room" by Paul Cornell (May 29, 2013), edited by Martin
 "Nuestra Señora de la Esperanza" by Carrie Vaughn (October 15, 2014), edited by Martin
 "Prompt. Professional. Pop!" by Walter Jon Williams (November 21, 2014), edited by Martin
 "Discards" by David D. Levine (March 30, 2016), edited by Patrick Nielsen Hayden
 "The Thing About Growing Up in Jokertown" by Carrie Vaughn (December 21, 2016), edited by Martin
 "The Atonement Tango" by Stephen Leigh (January 18, 2017), edited by Martin
 "When the Devil Drives" by Melinda Snodgrass (July 5, 2017), edited by Martin
 "Evernight" (February 21, 2018) by Victor Milán, edited by Martin
 "The Flight of Morpho Girl" (May 2, 2018) by Caroline Spector and Bradley Denton, edited by Martin
 "Fitting In" (October 24, 2018) by Max Gladstone, edited by Martin 
 "How to Move Spheres and Influence People" (27 March, 2019) by Marko Kloos, edited by Martin 
 "Long is the Way" (May 15, 2019) by Carrie Vaughn and Sage Walker, edited by Martin 
 "The City That Never Sleeps" (August 28, 2019) by Walton Simons, edited by Martin 
 "Naked, Stoned, and Stabbed" (October 16, 2019) by Bradley Denton, edited by Martin 
 "The Visitor: Kill or Cure" by Mark Lawrence, edited by Martin
 "Berlin is Never Berlin" by Marko Kloos, edited by Martin
"Hammer and Tongs and a Rusty Nail" by Ian Tregillis, edited by Martin
 "Ripple Effects" by Laura J. Mixon, edited by Martin
 "Skin Deep" by Alan Brennert, edited by Martin
 "Hearts of Stone" by Emma Newman, edited by Martin
 "Grow" by Carrie Vaughn, edited by Martin

One additional short story, "Lies My Mother Told Me" by Spector, was published in the Dangerous Women anthology, also edited by Martin. The anthology was released December 3, 2013.

Wildcards.com has also published:
 "I Have No Voice and I Must Zoom Meeting" by Paul Cornell

Notes

References

External links 
 
 Wild Cards series at Macmillan Publishers, parent company of Tor Books

Wild Cards